Thelosia impedita is a moth in the Apatelodidae family. It was described by Harrison Gray Dyar Jr. in 1928. It is found in Brazil.

References

Arctiidae genus list at Butterflies and Moths of the World of the Natural History Museum

Apatelodidae
Moths described in 1928
Moths of South America